Dzaoudzi is a commune in the French overseas department of Mayotte, in the Indian Ocean. The commune of Dzaoudzi (sometimes called Dzaoudzi-Labattoir), made up of the twin towns of Dzaoudzi and Labattoir, is located on the small island of Petite-Terre (or Pamanzi). It was previously the capital of Mayotte, but the capital was relocated in 1977 to Mamoudzou, on the island of Grande-Terre (Maore), the main island of Mayotte.

The Foreign Legion Detachment in Mayotte has been based in Dzaoudzi since 1973.

Geography
The town of Dzaoudzi is located on a rocky outcropping which was once a separate islet.  It is now linked to Pamanzi Island and the rest of Dzaoudzi Commune by the Boulevard des Crabes, a road constructed atop an artificial dike.

Climate 
Dzaoudzi features a tropical wet and dry climate under the Köppen climate classification. The wet season spans from December through April while the dry season covers the remaining seven months. Dzaoudzi is slightly cooler during the peak of its dry season with average temperatures hovering around  during its cooler period. Average temperatures are  during its warmest period.

Demographics
The commune is home to 17,831 (Census 2017), the majority of whom live in the town of Labattoir.

Transportation

A system of ferry barges operated by the Société des Transports Maritimes link Dzaoudzi to the island of Grande-Terre.

The international airport for Mayotte is located on Pamanzi Island in the neighboring commune of Pamandzi.

See also
St. Michael's Church

References

External links

Insee

 
Populated places in Mayotte
Communes of Mayotte